Love Me Tomorrow is a 2016 Philippine romantic drama film starring Piolo Pascual, Dawn Zulueta and Coleen Garcia. It is directed by Gino M. Santos. It was released on May 25, 2016 and produced by Star Cinema.

Cast 
Dawn Zulueta as Cristy Domingo-Gonzales
 Piolo Pascual as JC Santos
 Coleen Garcia as Janine Monteagudo
 Freddie Webb as Manuel Monteclaro
 Carmi Martin as Angelina "Angie" Monteclaro	
 Maxene Magalona as Jessica
 Lui Villaruz as DJ Jorell
 RK Bagatsing as DJ Kiks		
 Marco Gumabao as Carlos
 Ana Abad-Santos as Ditas
 Marnie Lapuz as Marichu
 Ruby Ruiz as Manang Elvie	
 Francesca Floirendo as Chloe
 Barbie Imperial as Jerl	
 Sam Thurman as DJ Nick	
 Eva Ronda as Casey
 Mica Javier as Mara
 Ivan Carapiet as LA
 Loren Burgos as Veterinarian
 Mars Miranda as DJ 1
 Marc Marasigan as DJ 2
 Marc Naval as DJ 3

Special Participation 
 Bea Alonzo as Patricia Morales (Cristy's New Friend and JC's Long Time Love Partner)
 Richard Gomez as Ethan Alvarez (Cristy's Long Time Love Partner)

Music
The theme song "Will You Still Love Me Tomorrow" was originally sung by The Shirelles in 1960. In 2016, Juris covered the said theme song of the movie title. An EDM remix was done covered by KZ Tandingan.

See also 
 List of Filipino films in 2016

References

External links 
 

2016 films
Philippine romantic drama films
2016 romantic drama films
2010s Tagalog-language films
2010s English-language films
Star Cinema films
2016 multilingual films
Philippine multilingual films